FC Fortuna Sharhorod is an amateur Ukrainian football club from Sharhorod, Vinnytsia Oblast.

League and cup history

{|class="wikitable"
|-bgcolor="#efefef"
! Season
! Div.
! Pos.
! Pl.
! W
! D
! L
! GS
! GA
! P
!Domestic Cup
!colspan=2|Europe
!Notes
|}

 
Amateur football clubs in Ukraine
Football clubs in Vinnytsia Oblast